Rancho Rincon de la Puente del Monte was a  Mexican land grant in the Salinas Valley, in present-day Monterey County, California given in 1836  by Governor Nicolás Gutiérrez  to Teodoro Gonzalez.  The grant extended along the north bank of the Salinas River, across from Francisco Lugo's Rancho Paraje de Sanchez, and encompassed present day Gonzales

History
Teodoro Gonzalez (1806–) came to Monterey from Mexico in 1825. He served as alcalde in 1836, and received the seven square league Rancho Rincon de la Puente del Monte grant in 1836.  Teodoro Gonzalez married Guadalupe Villarnel (1808 –) after her husband Vicente Rico died.  Guadalupe Villarnel de Rico was the mother of Francisco Rico grantee of Rancho San Lorenzo.

With the cession of California to the United States following the Mexican-American War, the 1848 Treaty of Guadalupe Hidalgo provided that the land grants would be honored.  As required by the Land Act of 1851, a claim for Rancho Rincon de la Puente del Monte was filed with the Public Land Commission in 1852,  and the grant was patented to Teodoro Gonzales in 1866.

Gonzalez sons, Alfredo Gonzalez (b. 1845) and Mariano Gonzalez (b. 1848), founded the town of Gonzales in 1874.

See also
Ranchos of California
List of Ranchos of California

References

Rincon de la Puente del Monte
Rincon de la Puente del Monte
Rincon de la Puente del Monte